Mor Ni Conchobair, Princess of Connacht and Queen of Munster, died 1190.

Mor was the only full-sister of King Ruaidhri Ua Conchobair of Connacht. Their parents were Tairrdelbach Ua Conchobair and Caillech De Ni hEidhin of Aidhne. She went on to marry King Tairdelbach Ua Briain (died 1167), who had sons

 Muirchertach - succeeded his father but died in 1168
 Brian of Slieve Bloom - (blinded 1169, his son Muirchertach contested the kingdom of Thomond 
 Domnall Mor Ua Briain - reigned 1168-1194 as last King of Munster

Mor herself died in 1190. Her brother Ruaidhri died in 1198.

References

 Ua Conchobair, Ruaidhri, Ailbhe Mac Shamrahan, in Dictionary of Irish Biography ... to the Year 2002, p. 572

People from County Galway
Nobility from County Limerick
12th-century Irish people
Medieval Gaels from Ireland
Irish princesses
Irish royal consorts
12th-century Irish women
1190 deaths
Year of birth unknown